Stursdon is a hamlet north-northwest of Kilkhampton in north Cornwall, England, United Kingdom.

References

Hamlets in Cornwall